17β-Dihydroequilenin, or β-dihydroequilenin, also known as δ6,8-17β-estradiol or 6,8-didehydro-17β-estradiol, as well as estra-1,3,5(10),6,8-pentaen-3,17β-diol, is a naturally occurring steroidal estrogen found in horses which is closely related to equilin, equilenin, and estradiol, and, as the 3-sulfate ester sodium salt, is a minor constituent (0.5%) of conjugated estrogens (Premarin). 17β-Dihydroequilenin has unexpectedly shown a selective estrogen receptor modulator (SERM)-like profile of estrogenic activity in studies with monkeys, in which beneficial effects on bone and the cardiovascular system were noted but proliferative responses in breast and endometrium were not observed.

See also
 List of estrogens § Equine estrogens

References

Secondary alcohols
Estranes
Estrogens